Package Deal is a Canadian television sitcom created by Andrew Orenstein about three brothers and the woman who comes between them. It debuted on City on June 18, 2013 and ran for two seasons.

Premise
Danny thinks Kim might be the one. His older brothers, who raised him after their parents died, are not so fond of her. Sheldon avoids relationships but is in favour of one-night stands. Ryan's wife divorced him and hooked up with a fellow surgeon after he put her through medical school. Kim is not happy with how intimately involved Sheldon and Ryan are in Danny's life.

Cast
Randal Edwards as Danny, a criminal defense lawyer
Harland Williams as Sheldon, a stubborn and politically incorrect salesman
Jay Malone as Ryan, a metrosexual former house-husband
Julia Voth as Kim, owner of a loose-tea shop

Recurring cast
Eugene Levy as McKenzie, a client of Danny's whose wives keep mysteriously dying
Pamela Anderson as Dr. Sydney Forbes, Ryan's quirky therapist who has an intimate approach

Production
Package Deal is a four-camera comedy primarily filmed with a studio audience, which is rare for Canadian television. The concept of the show comes from creator Andrew Orenstein's experiences with his family. The first-season finale was filmed in Burnaby, British Columbia on January 25, 2013.

Package Deal was renewed for a second season on January 21, 2014.  In March 2015, Rogers Media announced that the series would not return for a third season.

Broadcast
On May 29, 2013, Citytv announced it had commissioned 13 episodes of Package Deal for the 2012-13 mid-season television season. It was announced on 1 April 2013 that the show would premiere on 6 May, taking the spot in the schedule that had been occupied by Seed. Later in April that was changed to 24 June. As part of Rogers' upfront presentation on 4 June it was announced that Package Deal had been moved to the autumn and would be on Mondays at 8:30 ET. The series premiere was subsequently again changed to 18 June at 9 p.m. ET/PT, 10 p.m. MT, and 8 p.m. CT and labelled a special preview.

Episodes

Season 1 (2013–14)

Season 2 (2014–15)

References

External links

2010s Canadian sitcoms
2013 Canadian television series debuts
2014 Canadian television series endings
Citytv original programming
Television shows set in Toronto
Television shows filmed in Burnaby